Cherukara railway station is a minor railway station serving the town of Cherukara in the Malappuram district of Kerala. It lies in the Shoranur–Mangalore section of the Southern Railways.  Trains halting at the station connect the town to prominent cities in India such as Nilambur, Shoranur and Angadipuram.

Nilambur–Shoranur line

This station is on a historic branch line, one of the shortest broad-gauge railway lines in India. This entire station route is known for its scenic beauty surrounded by trees on both sides of the track. This station has trees over the platform which is the main reason for its scenic beauty.

References

Railway stations in Palakkad district
Nilambur–Shoranur railway line